The Rebel Intruders (also known as Killer Army) is a Shaw Brothers film directed by Chang Cheh and starring the Venom Mob.

Plot
China is ripped apart by a civil war, and thousands of displaced refugees swarm into towns not yet ravaged by war. Three such refugees (Kuo Chui, Lo Man, and Chiang Sheng) arrive in one town. The three swear an oath of brotherhood in a similar fashion to Liu Bei Guan Yu and Zhang Fei. They join forces with the local rebel leaders (Sun Chien and Yang Hsuing) to escape to the south before getting into trouble with Lu Feng who is out to exterminate all rebels.

Cast
Kuo Chui
Lu Feng
Chiang Sheng 
Yang Hsuing 
Sun Chien
Wang Li 
Lo Mang

External links
 

Kung fu films
1980 martial arts films
1980 films
Shaw Brothers Studio films
Films directed by Chang Cheh
Hong Kong martial arts films
1980s Hong Kong films